Diego García-Borreguero is the Director of the Sleep Research Institute in Madrid, Spain. Until 2005, he was Director of the Sleep Disorders Center at the Department of Neurology of the Fundación Jiménez Díaz (Autonomous University of Madrid). He has completed fellowships in sleep medicine and sleep research at the National Institutes of Health in Bethesda, Maryland, USA and underwent residency training at the Max Planck Institute in Munich, Germany. He received his MD from the University of Navarre (Pamplona, Spain) and completed his PhD at the University of Munich.

García-Borreguero's main area of research is movement disorders in sleep, and restless legs syndrome (RLS) in particular. He has published extensively in this field in international peer-reviewed journals. He is Vice Chair of both the International and the European Restless Legs Study Group and a member of the Medical Advisory Board of the Restless Legs Foundation. In addition, Dr García-Borreguero is President of the Spanish Sleep Society. He is also a member of numerous professional organizations related to the field of sleep science, such as the World Association of Sleep Medicine (WASM) and the American Academy of Sleep Medicine  (elected fellow).

Garcia-Borreguero has published widely in the field of sleep, and particularly in RLS.

References 

University of Navarra alumni
Ludwig Maximilian University of Munich alumni
Academic staff of the Autonomous University of Madrid
Living people
Year of birth missing (living people)